Mechanicsville is a borough in Schuylkill County, Pennsylvania, United States. Part of the Pottsville Area School District, it lies between Pottsville and Port Carbon. Pottsville Street is the community's main street. 

The population was 463 at the time of the 2020 census.

Geography
Mechanicsville is located at  (40.691596, -76.181576).

According to the United States Census Bureau, the borough has a total area of 0.3 square mile (0.9 km2), all  land.

Demographics

As of the census of 2000, there were 515 people, 209 households and 149 families residing in the borough. 

The population density was 1,559.8 people per square mile (602.6/km2). There were 230 housing units at an average density of 696.6/sq mi (269.1/km2). 

The racial makeup of the borough was 98.25% White, 0.19% African American, 0.19% Asian, and 1.36% from two or more races. Hispanic or Latino of any race were 0.78% of the population.

There were 209 households, out of which 28.7% had children under the age of eighteen living with them; 57.4% were married couples living together, 9.1% had a female householder with no husband present, and 28.7% were non-families. 23.9% of all households were made up of individuals, and 13.9% had someone living alone who was sixty-five years of age or older. 

The average household size was 2.46 and the average family size was 2.93.

In the borough the population was spread out, with 22.5% under the age of eighteen, 6.0% from eighteen to twenty-four, 25.6% from twenty-five to forty-four, 25.4% from forty-five to sixty-four, and 20.4% who were sixty-five years of age or older. The median age was forty-two years. 

For every one hundred females there were 87.3 males. For every one hundred females aged eighteen and over, there were 90.0 males.

The median income for a household in the borough was $34,583, and the median income for a family was $40,556. Males had a median income of $33,750 compared with that of $21,354 for females. 

The per capita income for the borough was $16,511. 

Roughly 8.0% of families and 12.1% of the population were below the poverty line, including 18.7% of those under age eighteen and 16.7% of those aged sixty-five or over.

References

Populated places established in 1914
Boroughs in Schuylkill County, Pennsylvania
1914 establishments in Pennsylvania